Brian Houston is a singer-songwriter from Belfast, Northern Ireland. His style varies from Christian to roots and mainstream-oriented.

Discography
Crush (1994)
Sex, Love & Religion (1995)
Good News Junkie (1997)
In The Words Of Dr Luke (1998)
35 Summers (1999)
Big Smile (2000)
Mea Culpa (2001)
Roller Coaster (2002)
The Valley (2003)
Thirteen Days in August (2004)
Jesus And Justice (2005)
Sugar Queen (2006)
Content Not Volume (2007)Three Feet From Gold (2008)Gospel Road (2009)The Raw Sessions (2010)Joy to the World (2010)The Rehearsal Tapes (2011)Shelter (2012)Mercy: Jesus Don't Forget My Name (2013)Bring It On (2014)Carolina (2015)Songs From My Father'' (2016)

References

External links
Official Site

Brian Houston at tradmusic.com
Artist Profile at Cross Rhythms

Living people
Year of birth missing (living people)
Songwriters from Northern Ireland
Musicians from Belfast
Male singers from Northern Ireland